Palmbach is a river of Hesse and Rhineland-Palatinate, Germany. It flows into the Aar near Hahnstätten.

See also
List of rivers of Hesse
List of rivers of Rhineland-Palatinate

References

Rivers of Hesse
Rivers of Rhineland-Palatinate
Rivers of Germany